The Mongolian People's Army (Mongolian: Монголын Ардын Арми), also known as the Mongolian People's Revolutionary Army (Mongolian: Монгол Ардын Хувьсгалт Цэрэг) or the Mongolian Red Army (Mongolian: Монгол Улаан армийн) was an institution of the Mongolian People's Revolutionary Party constituting as the armed forces of the Mongolian People's Republic. It was established on 18 March 1921 as a secondary army under Soviet Red Army command during the 1920s and during World War II. In 1992, the army's structure changed and then reorganized and renamed as the Mongolian Armed Forces.

History

Creation of the army
One of the first actions of the new Mongolian People's Revolutionary Party authorities was the creation of a native communist army in 1921 under the leadership of adept cavalry commander Damdin Sükhbaatar in order to fight against Russian troops from the White movement and Chinese forces.  The decision to create an army was made on 9 February 1921.

On 13 March 1921, four cavalry regiments were formed from partisan detachments. The MPRA was aided by the Red Army of the Russian SFSR, which helped to secure the Mongolian People's Republic and remained in its territory until at least 1925. A Military Council was formed soon after among the military leadership, while the General Staff was led by Soviet specialists.

In September 1923, on the outskirts of Urga, the first cavalry school and an artillery school were opened, and a year later, the publication of the army newspaper began. On October 16, 1925, Mongolia adopted a law on universal conscription, and in 1926, the creation of temporary detachments of the people's militia began.

1930s conflicts and WWII

Initially during the native revolts of the early 1930s and the Japanese border probes beginning in the mid-1930s, Soviet Red Army troops in Mongolia amounted to little more than instructors for the native army and as guards for diplomatic and trading installations. Domestically, it took part in the suppression of the 1932 armed uprising. It also involved in many border conflicts against Manchukuo and the Kwantung Army (one of the largest parts of the Imperial Japanese Army) and the Chinese National Revolutionary Army. The Imperial Japanese Army recorded 152 minor incidents on the border of Manchuria between 1932 and 1934. The number of incidents increased to over 150 per year in 1935 and 1936, and the scale of incidents became larger.

In January 1935, the first armed battle,  occurred on the border between Mongolia and Manchukuo. Scores of Mongolian cavalry units engaged with a Manchukuo army patrol unit near the Buddhist temple of Halhamiao. The Manchukuo Army incurred slight casualties, including a Japanese military advisor.

In these battles, both the Japanese and Mongolian Armies use a small number of armoured fighting vehicles and military aircraft.

In the 1939 Battles of Khalkhin Gol (or Nomonhan) heavily armed Red Army forces under Georgy Zhukov assisted by Mongolian troops under Khorloogiin Choibalsan decisively defeated Imperial Japanese Army forces under Michitarō Komatsubara. During a meeting with Joseph Stalin in Moscow in early 1944, Choibalsan requested military assistance to the MPRA for border protection. Units of Mongolian People's Army were also supported and allied with the Soviet Red Army on the western flank of the Soviet invasion of Manchuria in 1945.

Stalinist repressions against Mongolian People's Army 
During the 18 months of violence, Monks who were not executed were forcibly conscripted into the MPA. At the same time, 187 persons from the military leadership were killed soon the orders of Marshal Choibalsan. The army stayed linked to Soviet Red Army intelligence groups and the NKVD.

Cold war era

During the Pei-ta-shan Incident, elite Qinghai Chinese Muslim cavalry were sent by the Chinese Kuomintang to destroy the Mongols and the Russians positions in 1947. The military of Mongolia's purpose was national defense, protection of local communist establishments, and collaboration with Soviet forces in future military actions against exterior enemies, up until the 1990 Democratic Revolution in Mongolia. In February 1957, the Politburo of the Central Committee of the MPRP passed a resolution on the establishment of a voluntary association to assist the People's Army. In 1961, the Defense and Labor Association was established by the Council of Ministers of the People's Republic of Mongolia. The first civil defense in the country was established in 1964 as the 122nd Civil Defense Battalion of the MPA. Moreover, all Mongolian citizens were obliged to participate in civil defense training organized by the Civil Defense Office of the Ministry of Defense.

Education

Political indoctrination
The central Political Administration Unit was established in the army in 1921 to supervise the work of political commissars (Politruk) and party cells in all army units and to provide a political link with the Central Committee of the MPRP in the army.  The unit served to raise morale and to prevent enemy political propaganda.  Up to one third of army units were members of the party and others were in the Mongolian Revolutionary Youth League.

The Red Mongol Army received sixty percent of the government budget in early years and it was expanded from 2,560 men in 1923 to 4,000 in 1924 and to 7,000 in 1927.  The native armed forces stayed linked to Soviet Red Army intelligence groups and NKVD, Mongolian secret police, and Buryat Mongol Comintern agents acted as administrators and represented the real power in the country albeit under direct Soviet guidance.

Training 
By 1926 the government planned to train 10,000 conscripts annually and to increase the training period to six months. Chinese intelligence reports in 1927 indicated that between 40,000 and 50,000 reservists could be mustered at short notice.  In 1929 a general mobilization was called to test the training and reserve system.  The expected turnout was to have been 30,000 troops but only 2,000 men presented.  This failure initiated serious reforms in recruiting and training systems.

Organization

Strength
In 1921–1927, the land forces, almost exclusively horsemen, numbered about 17,000 mounted troops and boasted more than 200 heavy machine guns, 50 mountain howitzers, 30 field guns, seven armored cars, and a maximum of up to 20 light tanks.

Basic units and motorization 

The basic unit was the 2,000-man cavalry regiment consisting of three
squadrons.  Each 600-plus-man squadron was divided into five companies: a  machine gun company, and an engineer unit.  Cavalry regiments were organized into larger units--brigades or divisions—which included artillery and service support units.  The chief advantage of this force was mobility over the great distances in Mongolia: small units were able to cover more than 160 km in 24 hours.

List of Mongolian Army divisions and other units:

 1st Cavalry Division
 2nd Cavalry Division
 3rd Cavalry Division
 4th Cavalry Division
 5th Cavalry Division
 6th Cavalry Division
 7th Cavalry Division
 8th Cavalry Division
 9th Cavalry Division
 10th Cavalry Division
 7th Motorized Armored Brigade
 3rd Separate Tank Regiment
 3rd Artillery Regiment
 Aviation Mixed Division
 Chemical defence-engineering regiment

Branches

Special troops of the Ground Forces

Armoured corps
Under Soviet support campaign for mechanization, the army formed its first mechanized unit in 1922. Also it was by structure in the ground force half-mechanization cavalry in the other units distributed to light armored vehicles until 1943. It began to process to motorised since 1943.
This is a list of Mongolian People's Army tanks and armour during the 1922s-World War II period.

Anti-aircraft forces 
Although little attention was paid to anti-aircraft weaponry in the Mongolian People's Army, a few dozen units of Soviet origin were known to be distributed to light armored outfits.

Mongolian People's Army Air Force

The Mongolian People's Army Aviation drastically improved with Soviet training and vastly ameliorated within a time span of several years. In May 1925, a Junkers F.13 entered service as the first aircraft in Mongolian civil and military-related aviation. In March 1931, the Soviet Union donated three Polikarpov R-1s to the Mongolian People's Army, with Mongolia further purchasing three R-1s. In 1932, an uprising broke out against Collectivization, which saw both Soviet and Mongolian-operated R-1s taking part in actions against the rebellion. The aircraft carried out reconnaissance, leaflet dropping, and bombing missions. Chinese intelligence reports that in 1945 the Mongolian People's Air Force had been with a three-fighter and three-bomber aviation-regiment, and one flight training school and greater air squadrons. It was reported that headquartered in the Mukden Manchukuo spy-section in October 1944 air force whole units had been 180 aircraft and 1231 airmen. The Mongolian People's Army Aviation demonstrated its full potential during the Battle of Khalkhin Gol, which was its largest engagement. Apart from intercepting intruding aircraft, People's Aviation was used heavily to repress domestic rebel movements.

The Mongolian People's Air Force has operated a variety of aircraft types.

Army ranks and uniform 

Conscript soldiers
Private
Lance Corporal
Corporal
Senior Corporal 
NCO's
Junior Sergeant
Sergeant
Senior Sergeant 
Training Sergeant 
Lead Sergeant
Officers
2nd Lieutenant
1st Lieutenant
Captain 
Major 
Lieutenant Colonel 
Colonel
Brigadier General
Major General 
Lieutenant General 
General 
On 28 April 1944, the Council of Ministers promoted the 11 officers to the rank of general, a rank that was never crossed before up until then. This date has been remembered as “Mongolian Generals' Day”.  The highest military ranks in the MPA army general, but in 2006 the Law on the Legal Status of Military Servicemen was amended to make it more developed to a Western model.

Because establishment of the Armed Forces was based on a Soviet military system in the 1920s, the Mongolian People's Army used similar uniforms with the Red Army, only with Mongolian distinctions. Until 1924, People's Army personnel wore traditional deel, which had their respective shoulder insignias. In the mid-1930s, the army adopted Soviet Gymnasterka and developed its true rank and distinction system. All personnel were distinct by their sleeve and collar insignias from the general population when the gymnastyorka was rather popular. After the Battle of Khalkhin Gol, slight modifications were made. In 1944 all uniforms and insignia were significantly changed to include shoulder insignia and camouflage cloaks, similar to Soviet uniform modifications but on olive green.

From the 1960s, the equipment and uniforms of the Mongolian People's Army were included a program to modernize the military. As before, the Mongolian People's Army (a Warsaw pact ally) was similar to the Soviet Red Army in appearance and structure.

Equipment

Ground Forces (1950–1990)

Air Force (1950–1990)

See also
17th Army 
39th Army

References

 
 
 

Military history of Mongolia
Mongolian People's Republic
Armies by country
Military units and formations established in 1921
Military units and formations disestablished in 1992
1921 establishments in Mongolia
20th-century disestablishments in Mongolia
Mongolia (1911–1924)
Mongolia–Soviet Union relations